Huggermugger, hugger mugger or hugger-mugger may refer to:
 Huggermugger, a 1989 trivia board game.
 Huggermugger, a character from a fantasy book series by Christopher Pearse Cranch
 Huggermugger, a cartoon character by Dick Guindon
 HuggerMugger, a 1994 album by The September When
 Huggermugger, a 1997 play by Scot Williams
 Hugger Mugger (novel), a novel by Robert B. Parker
 Hugger Mugger (horse), a racehorse
 Hugger Mugger Yoga Products, a manufacturer of yoga and meditation products in Salt Lake City, Utah
 Hugger Mugger, a webtoon by Fox and Ros